Myricus or Myrikous was a town of the ancient Troad. Stephanus of Byzantium says it was opposite to Tenedos and Lesbos.

Its site is unlocated.

References

Populated places in ancient Troad
Former populated places in Turkey
Lost ancient cities and towns